Lazar Carević (Cyrillic: Лазар Царевић; born 16 March 1999) is a Montenegrin professional footballer who plays as a goalkeeper for Serbian SuperLiga club Vojvodina and the Montenegro national team.

Club career
Carević began his senior career with Grbalj in the Montenegrin First League in 2015. He transferred to Barcelona B on 29 May 2017. He won the 2016–17 UEFA Youth League in his first season with the Barcelona youth academy. On 7 July 2020, he extended his contract with Barcelona B, keeping him at the side until 2023. On 6 November 2021, he appeared on the bench for the senior Barcelona side for the first time, for a La Liga match against Celta Vigo.

On 18 June 2022, Carević signed for Serbian SuperLiga club Vojvodina for 3 years.

International career
Carević is a youth international for Montenegro, having played for the Montenegro U17s, U19s and U21s.
He made his debut with the senior Montenegro national team in a friendly 1–0 loss to Armenia on 24 March 2022, coming on as a half-time sub.

Personal life
Carević's father, Marko Carević, is a Montenegrin politician, businessman, and football executive.

References

External links
 
 
 
 Barcelona profile
 FSCG Profile

1999 births
Living people
Sportspeople from Cetinje
Montenegrin footballers
Montenegro international footballers
Montenegro under-21 international footballers
Montenegro youth international footballers
Association football goalkeepers
FC Barcelona Atlètic players
OFK Grbalj players
Primera Federación players
Montenegrin First League players
Montenegrin expatriate footballers
Montenegrin expatriate sportspeople in Spain
Expatriate footballers in Spain
Serbs of Montenegro